James McNaughton (c. 1963 – 17 February 2014) was an Irish hurler who played as a right wing-back for the Antrim senior team.

McNaughton made his first appearance for the team during the 1982 'B' championship and became a regular player over the following decade. During that time he won two Ulster winner's medals.

At club level McNaughton was a seven-time Ulster medalist with Ruarí Óg Cushendall. In addition to this he also won eight county championship winners' medals.

He died in February 2014 at the age of 51.

References

1963 births
2014 deaths
Antrim inter-county hurlers
Hurling managers
Ruairi Og Cushendall hurlers
Ulster inter-provincial hurlers